Antionette Oyedupe Payne (born 22 April 1995) is an American-born Nigerian professional footballer who plays as a forward for Spanish Liga F club Sevilla FC and the Nigeria women's national team.

Early life
Payne was born and raised in Birmingham, Alabama to Nigerian parents. She is the older sister of fellow footballers Stephen and Nicole Payne.

Club career
From 2016 to 2018, Payne played with AFC Ajax. In June 2018, she joined Sevilla on a one-year contract, which was extended for two further years in 2019.

International career
Through birth and descent, Payne was eligible to play for the United States or Nigeria.

United States
Payne played for the United States under-17 team, and was in the team which won the 2012 CONCACAF Women's U-17 Championship.

Nigeria
In 2019, Payne declared her intention to end her international career with Nigeria. She made her senior debut on 18 February 2021 starting against Russian club CSKA Moscow at the Turkish Women's Cup. Her first appearance facing other national team was two days later against Uzbekistan.

References

1995 births
Living people
Citizens of Nigeria through descent
Nigerian women's footballers
Women's association football forwards
AFC Ajax (women) players
Sevilla FC (women) players
Eredivisie (women) players
Primera División (women) players
Nigeria women's international footballers
Nigerian expatriate women's footballers
Nigerian expatriate sportspeople in the Netherlands
Expatriate women's footballers in the Netherlands
Nigerian expatriate sportspeople in Spain
Expatriate women's footballers in Spain
Soccer players from Birmingham, Alabama
American women's soccer players
Duke Blue Devils women's soccer players
FC Kansas City draft picks
African-American women's soccer players
American sportspeople of Nigerian descent
American expatriate women's soccer players
American expatriate sportspeople in the Netherlands
American expatriate sportspeople in Spain
21st-century African-American sportspeople
21st-century African-American women